Stictiellina is a subtribe of traditional sphecidae in the family Crabronidae. There are at least 60 described species in Stictiellina.

Genera
 Chilostictia Gillaspy, 1983
 Glenostictia Gillaspy, 1962
 Microstictia Gillaspy, 1963
 Steniolia Say, 1837
 Stictiella J. Parker, 1917
 Xerostictia Gillaspy, 1963

References

Further reading

External links

 NCBI Taxonomy Browser, Stictiellina

Crabronidae